Abdallah Shahat (born May 10, 1985) is an Egyptian footballer who plays as a midfielder for ENPPI Club in the Egyptian Premier League.

Club career
In 2005, he signed with Egyptian Premier League side Ismaily.

International career
On 17 January 2011 he made his debut for the Egypt national football team in 2011 Nile Basin Tournament match against Uganda national football team.

References

1985 births
Living people
Ismaily SC players
Egyptian footballers
Egypt international footballers
Association football midfielders
ENPPI SC players
Egyptian Premier League players